Margaret Bayne Wilson (1795-1835) was a Scottish missionary, linguist and educator in India. The wife of fellow Church of Scotland missionary John Wilson, she established several schools in India, including the first girls' boarding school in western India, now called St. Columba High School.

Life
Margaret Bayne was born on 5 November 1795 in Greenock. Her sisters Anna and Hay Bayne would later continue her educational work in India after her death.

In 1828 she married John Wilson, and in 1829 they sailed to India together. She established several schools in India, training teachers for them.

She died on 19 April 1835 in India. Her husband published a memoir of her in 1840, including extracts from her letters and journals.

References

1795 births
1835 deaths
People from Greenock
Scottish Presbyterian missionaries
Presbyterian missionaries in India
Female Christian missionaries
19th-century Scottish educators
Scottish women educators
Founders of Indian schools and colleges